The Leland Hotel in Springfield, Illinois is a building that currently houses the Springfield office of the Illinois Commerce Commission.

The horseshoe sandwich, a local food specialty, was first served at the Leland Hotel in 1928.

References

Buildings and structures in Springfield, Illinois
Hotels in Illinois